Okehampton Parkway is a proposed railway station in Okehampton on the Dartmoor Line.  The station would be part of the Devon Metro and has been described as a priority station. The station is to be sited at the A30 junction at Stockley Hamlet and would be sited at the Business Park at Okehampton as well as serving a further 900 homes close to the site.

Following the Government's announcement of the reopening of rail lines closed in the 1960s and 1970s the line through the site has been proposed for a new  intermediate station between Okehampton and Crediton. Devon County Council has purchased a site for a new station.

History

In January 2018, it was revealed that Devon County Council were looking at options for a new parkway station and running regular services from it.

In April 2018, two preferred options for a new station which included an option for a double-sided platform which included a through platform and a bay platform. Another is for a platform single-sided platform on the south side of the railway with staggered faces. Exeter-bound trains would use the north through platform and the Dartmoor Railway would use the bay platform.

The Dartmoor Railway ceased operations in 2020, later that year the government announced the Exeter to Okehampton line would be reopened as the Dartmoor Line The railway to Exeter reopened on 20 November 2021.

References

Devon